Yosef Lishansky (1890 – 16 December 1917) was a Jewish paramilitary and a spy for the British in Ottoman Palestine. Upon his arrival in Palestine, Lishansky sought to join HaShomer but, denied membership, he founded a rival organization, HaMagen. Several years later, he joined the Jewish espionage organization, Nili. Lishansky was wanted by the Ottomans for his activities and was betrayed by HaShomer when he sought refuge with them. He escaped capture several times, but was eventually caught and sentenced to death in Damascus.

Early life
Lishansky was born near Kiev in the Russian Empire in 1890, to Eidel and Ya'akov Toviah. After most of his family was killed in a fire, he made Aliyah with his father (the reported year of their Aliyah varies between 1891 and 1896). They settled with Yosef's brother, Israel, who was living in Metula. His father soon disappeared during a trip to Jerusalem, and Lishansky began living at his brother's home. Excelling in his studies, he was sent to a seminar in Jerusalem, but did not complete his educational studies due to financial difficulties. Instead, Yosef travelled to Egypt, where he managed an agricultural farm for two years and then returned to the Land of Israel. In 1910, he married Rivka Broshkovsky, and they had a daughter, Ivriya, and a son, Toviah.

Jewish defense organizations
In 1912, Lishansky attempted to join the HaShomer organization. HaShomer required a trial period for all recruits, and Lishansky was sent to guard in Poria, Rishon LeZion, Ben Shemen and finally Menahemia. In February 1915, Lishansky's force killed the leader of an Arab gang that attacked the village. Because of HaShomer's policy of avoiding blood feuds with the Arabs, Lishansky was declined entry to the organization. This was later perceived simply as an excuse not to accept Lishansky, who was proficient in the use of weapons, horseback riding and Arabic. Israel Shochat, a leader of HaShomer, later wrote that Lishansky often demonstrated weakness, adventurism and boastfulness.

Lishansky then decided to form a rival organization, named HaMagen ("The Shield"), which included rejected HaShomer members. The group did not wish to directly compete with HaShomer, so they selected the southern Jewish villages, which were previously guarded by Arabs. Lishansky was chosen as the leader of the organization, and travelled to the south to negotiate with the villages. HaMagen replaced the Arab guards in Ruhama, Be'er Tuvia and Mazkeret Batya, and later Gedera. Despite a clause in HaMagen's charter preventing it from guarding villages formerly or presently guarded by HaShomer, the latter attempted and failed to disband HaMagen.

In January 1917, unknown by his HaMagen co-members, Lishansky left Egypt to focus on his activities in Nili. Ill will was created and led to the decline of HaMagen. Despite this, some HaMagen members joined Lishansky in Nili.

Nili activities and death

Lishansky joined Nili in December 1915, when Avshalom Feinberg was arrested for espionage and held in Beersheba. Because he was active in the south, he was recruited by Feinberg to pass information to and from Sarah Aaronsohn, who was operating from Atlit. He did this by hiding notes in the loaves of bread passed to the prisoners. In January 1917, after Feinberg was released and sought to secretly travel to Egypt to meet with the British, he was accompanied by Lishansky, who had intimate knowledge of the area. On 20 January they were attacked by two Ottoman soldiers and a gang of Bedouin near Rafah, which left Feinberg dead and Lishansky wounded. Lishansky was left to die but managed to reach a British patrol that took him to a hospital in Port Said, where he met Aaron Aaronsohn on 25 January 1917, and told him about Feinberg's death. Because Lishansky was the only witness to the killing, rumors started circulating that he was the one who killed Feinberg for personal reasons, or because of a romance with Sarah Aaronsohn. They were disproved only after the Six-Day War, when Feinberg's remains were found and the Bedouin in the region interrogated.

Lishansky subsequently returned to Atlit, Nili's central base of operations, and shifted his entire focus on the organization. He was responsible for collecting espionage reports from Nili agents in the vicinity, and managing the finances funnelled from Egypt. In April 1917, Lishansky again travelled to Egypt, against the will of his superior, Aaron Aaronsohn. He returned in June and continued his activity in Nili.

In October 1917, while Lishansky was in Zikhron Ya'akov, the Ottoman authorities received information about Nili's activities by accidentally catching a homing pigeon with a message from Sarah Aaronsohn, and after capturing the Nili operative Na'aman Belkind, they found out about a cell in Zikhron. They encircled the village, capturing Sarah Aaronsohn, but Lishansky managed to escape, and became a fugitive with a price on his head. He met with HaShomer members carrying gold and accompanied them to Tel Adas.

HaShomer, which was opposed to Lishansky's activities, nevertheless decided to hide him, although as pressure from the Turks increased, they held another meeting and this time decided to execute him and hand his body over to the authorities. He was led to a place near Metula on 9 October, shot twice, and left for dead. However, he did not die and by the time the Turkish soldiers reached the area, he had escaped.

On 17 October Lishansky found refuge in Petah Tikva with friends of Aaron Aaronsohn's, but they were reluctant to hide him and after two days sent him on his way. He travelled south in hopes of crossing the border in the Sinai Peninsula and reaching British lines. On the night of 19–20 October, Lishansky attempted to steal a camel from Bedouins in the Shephelah region. He was caught and turned over to the Ottoman authorities. The Ottomans held and interrogated him in Ramla and Jerusalem, and after ten days in Jerusalem he was moved to Damascus.

During his time in prison, Lishansky contacted the Yishuv and asked for funds to bribe his way out of incarceration. Meir Dizengoff, one of the leaders of Tel Aviv, denied funding not only to bribe Lishansky's way to freedom, but even for the succor he provided other prisoners including anti-Zionists, despite having received the money from Nili. Lishansky disclosed members of HaShomer to the Turks, and by some accounts members of Nili as well. He was sentenced to death by hanging, along with the fellow Nili member Na'aman Belkind (who complained of the sentence since he withheld nothing during interrogations). They were hanged in a public square in Damascus on 16 December 1917. On 24 December 1919 Lishansky and Belkind's bodies were transferred to a cemetery in Rishon LeZion, although less than 20 people attended the funeral as part of the anti-Nili sentiment in the Yishuv at the time. In August 1979, Lishansky's body was moved again in a state ceremony to Mount Herzl, near the grave of Avshalom Feinberg.

Public image
Lishansky was generally seen in a negative light in the Yishuv, partly due to Nili's overall problematic image.  Other factors included rumors about backstabbing Avshalom Feinberg, and unfavorable personality traits. His grave in Rishon LeZion was vandalized several times over the years, and in 1937, Habima Theatre ran a play portraying him in a negative light.

Lishansky's image underwent a slow transformation to the image of a national hero, along with the transformation of Nili's image in general.  After Feinberg's burial site was found near Rafah after the Six-Day War and Lishansky's name was cleared, more Israelis began to view him positively, and a request was sent to Prime Minister Levi Eshkol to move Lishansky's grave to Mount Herzl. The request was denied, although the struggle to improve his image resumed and gained strength after "The Revolution" of 1977, when the right-wing party, Likud, was elected to form a government for the first time.  A movement called "The Public Committee for the Rehabilitation of Yosef Lishansky" was founded, including notable figures like Uri Zvi Greenberg and Rehavam Ze'evi. The movement succeeded in gaining recognition for Lishansky's activities in World War I, and the transfer of his remains in a state ceremony to Mount Herzl on 8 August 1979.

References

1890 births
1917 deaths
Executed spies
Jews in Ottoman Palestine
Executed Russian people
World War I spies for the United Kingdom
People executed by the Ottoman Empire by hanging
Executed Ukrainian people
Emigrants from the Russian Empire to the Ottoman Empire
Burials at Mount Herzl